The November moth (Epirrita dilutata) is a moth of the family Geometridae. The species was first described by Michael Denis and Ignaz Schiffermüller in 1775. It can be found in the Palearctic realm in western Europe from central Scandinavia to the Mediterranean the Caucasus and western Russia.

The wingspan is 38–44 mm, the forewings being variably marked with alternating pale and dark bands. The forewing ground colour is pale with darker grey and tinted brown. It has wavy lines. The hindwing is white grey with two lines. The distal fascia points in to the discal spot. Melanism is common and in some locations all-dark individuals make up the majority of the population. The species is extremely similar to three of its relatives, the pale November moth , the autumnal moth and the small autumnal moth  and they cannot usually be separated without examination of the genitalia. See Townsend et al.
 
The November moth flies at night from September to November and is attracted to light and sometimes to nectar-rich flowers.

The caterpillar is green with red markings and feeds on a wide range of trees and shrubs. The species overwinters as an egg.

Recorded food plants 
Acer - maple
Betula - birch
Corylus - hazel
Crataegus - hawthorn
Fraxinus - ash
Malus - apple
Prunus
Quercus - oak
Ulmus - elm

Notes
The flight season refers to the British Isles. This may vary in other parts of the range.

References 

Chinery, Michael Collins Guide to the Insects of Britain and Western Europe 1986 (Reprinted 1991)
Skinner, Bernard Colour Identification Guide to the Moths of the British Isles 1984

External links

November moth at UKMoths
Fauna Europaea
Lepidoptera of Belgium
Lepiforum e.V.
De Vlinderstichting 

Epirrita
Moths described in 1775
Moths of Europe
Taxa named by Michael Denis
Taxa named by Ignaz Schiffermüller
Palearctic Lepidoptera